Derreck Kayongo is an entrepreneur and human rights innovator born on January 25, 1970, in Kampala, Uganda, just before General Idi Amin Dada seized power in a military coup. As violence spread through the country and civil war erupted, Kayongo and his family became refugees in Kenya.  He later immigrated to America to attend the Thomas Jefferson University in Philidelphia. 

Though most well known as the founder of the Global Soap Project, Kayongo is an expert in environmental sustainability and global health, as well as a former CEO of the National Center for Civil and Human Rights in Atlanta, Georgia. In 2016 the Georgia State Senate passed a resolution recognizing Kayongo's incredible journey from refugee to CEO.

About the Global Soap Project
On his first day in America, Derreck Kayongo was preparing to take a shower in his hotel when he discovered the many different kinds of soap in his room: hand soap, face soap, body soap, shampoo, conditioner.  He had never seen so much soap for one person.  After a few days, he began to wonder what happened to the partially used soap that disappeared from his room each day and discovered that it was just thrown away.  Inspired by his experiences as a refugee in Kenya, and knowing that in-crisis communities are often without any soap at all,  Kayongo and his wife Sarah eventually formed Global Soap, a life-changing international aid organization that collected discarded soap from hotels, reprocessed it and distributed it to vulnerable populations worldwide. In 2015, Kayongo stepped down when Global Soap joined forces with Clean the World, a global health leader in water, sanitation, and hygiene (WASH) and sustainability. Although Global Soap has ceased operations, Clean the World's foundation continues to develop programs to support children and their families in at-risk communities around the world and has contributed towards a 60% reduction in the death rate of children under the age of 5 due to hygiene-related illnesses.

The National Center for Civil and Human Rights
In 2015 Derreck Kayongo was chosen as the chief executive officer for the National Center for Civil and Human Rights in Atlanta GA.  The center is located in downtown Atlanta at Centennial Olympic Park on land donated by the Coca-Cola Company and is involved in wide range of human rights issues.  Under Kayongo's leadership, the Center became even more vital to Atlanta's social and political scenes. In addition to the center's moving and beautifully designed galleries, the space is used for corporate meetings, weddings and a wide variety of events. He resigned as CEO in March 2018 to "focus on efforts as a motivational speaker as well as to write a book"

Public Life and Speaking

In 2014, Kayongo joined the elite TED TALK speakers in Charleston, SC, and he travels the world sharing his knowledge and experiences. In his words, he is "giving voice to the voiceless" since many people affected by displacement and civil war never have a chance to be heard. Known for his optimistic energy, Kayongo is a joyful, expressive speaker whose stories entertain, educate and inspire audiences of all ages and backgrounds. He has done hundreds of interviews around the world and has been seen on CNN, the Christiana Amanpour Show and BBC's Focus on Africa. In December 2015, Bo Emerson of The Atlanta Journal-Constitution referenced an earlier AJC article, writing that "In describing Kayongo's rhetorical skills, staff writer Matt Kempner wrote, 'This is his greatest strength: getting people inspired to see the bigger picture. Convincing them that even the little guy can do something big.'"

President Jimmy Carter chose Kayongo to interview him as part of the National Archives’ Amending America Initiative

Education
Derreck Kayongo holds an honorary doctorate from Oglethorpe University and is a graduate of the prestigious Fletcher school of Law and Diplomacy at Tufts University. He was also made an honoris causa initiate of Omicron Delta Kappa at East Carolina University in 2013.

References

External links
 "Global Soap Project." History «. Globalsoap.org, n.d. Web. 20 June 2016. 
 "Our Team." National Center for Civil and Human Rights Inc. N.p., n.d. Web. 20 June 2016. 
 "Center for Civil and Human Rights" National Center for Civil and Human Rights Inc.,| Center for Civil and Human Rights. N.p., n.d. Web. 20 June 2016. 
 N.p., n.d. Web.
 Emerson, Bo. "Derreck Kayongo Is New CEO at Center for Civil and Human Rights." AJC.com: Atlanta Georgia News, AJC Sports, Atlanta Weather. Atlanta Journal-Constitution, 04 Dec. 2015. Web. 20 June 2016.
 A Universal Mission

Living people
Soaps
1970 births